Joe Sullivan (1906–1971) was a jazz pianist.

Joe Sullivan may also refer to:
Joe Sullivan (pitcher) (1910–1985), Major League Baseball pitcher
Joe Sullivan (shortstop) (1870–1897), Major League Baseball shortstop
Joe Sullivan (footballer) (1877–1935), Australian rules footballer
Joe Sullivan (Internet security expert) (born 1968), Internet security expert

See also
Joseph Sullivan (disambiguation)
Jo Sullivan, soprano